Ocean Chief was a clipper ship used in a regular packet service and as a passenger ship for bounty emigrants to Australia between June 1854 and December 1861 at the time of the Australian gold rushes.

Original
The original Ocean Chief was built in the United States at Thomaston, Maine, by Joshua C. Morton (born 1789) and his son Charles, one of two clippers that they built. Completed in 1853, she was a fast and consistent sailer and made an average passage of 74 days.

The Black Ball Line (founded 1852 – ceased 1871) owners James Baines & Thomas MacKay, Liverpool purchased the vessel for a regular mail service between Liverpool and Melbourne. She also visited other ports including Hobart, Tasmania, and New Zealand.

In 1862, Ocean Chief arrived at Bluff Harbour, New Zealand, under Captain T. Brown, with a cargo of 4,000 sheep. On the morning of 23 January 1862, the crew burned ship, believing that they could get rich in the nearby Otago Gold Rush.

Voyages

Replacement
Another ship, named Wild Ranger – built in the United States in 1853 by J. O. Curtis at Medford, Massachusetts – was purchased in 1862 as a replacement ship and renamed Ocean Chief. This ship was slightly smaller, being of 930 tons. In 1866, she was sold to E. Angel, Liverpool. She sank in a large storm in the Bay of Bengal off Calcutta, India, in 1872.

References

Clippers
Ships built in Thomaston, Maine
Tall ships of the United Kingdom
Victorian-era merchant ships of the United Kingdom
Victorian-era passenger ships of the United Kingdom
Maritime incidents in January 1862
1853 ships
Bluff, New Zealand
Ship fires
Arson in New Zealand
Arson attacks on vehicles
Shipwrecks of New Zealand
Shipwrecks in the Bay of Bengal
1862 in New Zealand
Maritime history of Tasmania